Thierry Alain Florian Taulemesse (born 31 January 1986 in Bagnols-sur-Cèze, Languedoc-Roussillon), known as Florian, is a French professional footballer who plays as a striker for Cypriot club Nea Salamis Famagusta FC.

Honours
AEK Larnaca
Cypriot Cup: 2017–18

References

External links

1986 births
Living people
People from Bagnols-sur-Cèze
Sportspeople from Gard
French footballers
Footballers from Occitania (administrative region)
Association football forwards
Championnat National players
Gazélec Ajaccio players
FC Mulhouse players
FC Gueugnon players
Segunda División players
Segunda División B players
Terrassa FC footballers
Orihuela CF players
CE Sabadell FC footballers
FC Cartagena footballers
Belgian Pro League players
Challenger Pro League players
K.A.S. Eupen players
Cypriot First Division players
Cypriot Second Division players
AEK Larnaca FC players
Ethnikos Achna FC players
Nea Salamis Famagusta FC players
French expatriate footballers
Expatriate footballers in Spain
Expatriate footballers in Belgium
Expatriate footballers in Cyprus
French expatriate sportspeople in Spain
French expatriate sportspeople in Belgium
French expatriate sportspeople in Cyprus